Yanzhou Prefecture was an administrative unit (prefecture) in Zhejiang Province of China during the Ming and Qing Dynasties. It was abolished in 1912, soon after the fall of the Qing. The territory of the former Yanzhou Prefecture is now part of the Hangzhou Prefecture-level city.

The prefectural capital was in Jiande, which, on account of this, was often referred to as Yanzhou Fu (严州府) both in Chinese and in Western languages. A transcription commonly seen in both French and English writing of the time was Yen-tcheou-fou, derived from French missionary writing.

Divisions
Yanzhou prefecture was composed of the following subdivisions.

Jiande County (建德縣/建德县)
Tonglu County (桐廬縣/桐庐县)
Chun'an County (淳安縣/淳安县)
Fenshui County (分水縣/分水县)
Sui'an County (遂安縣/遂安县)
Shouchang County (壽昌縣/寿昌县)

See also
Muzhou, the prefecture during the Sui, Tang, Wuyue and Song dynasties

Notes

Former prefectures in Zhejiang
Prefectures of the Ming dynasty
Prefectures of the Song dynasty
Prefectures of the Qing dynasty